SV Bevern is a German sports club from Bevern, mostly known for its football division. The club's colors are yellow and black.

History 
SV Bevern was founded in 1975. In the 2000s, the club played on Kreis level in the district of Cloppenburg. In 2013, SV Bevern won the Kreispokal and finished first in the Kreisliga Cloppenburg, being promoted to the Bezirksliga Weser-Ems 4. After being the Bezirksliga champions in 2016, they were promoted to the Landesliga Weser-Ems.

In 2019, SV Bevern became the champions of the Landesliga Weser-Ems. This usually would have meant a promotion to the Lower Saxon Oberliga, the fifth-highest league in Germany. However, SV Bevern declined the promotion for economical reasons. This allowed Kickers Emden to be promoted to the Oberliga despite coming in second. As of 2021, SV Bevern continues to play in the Landesliga.

Grounds 
The club plays its home matches at its headquarters north of Bevern. In 2017, the grounds were named "Sportpark Wernsing" after a sponsor.

Divisions 
SV Bevern consists of several divisions. It has 3 men's and 2 women's football teams and several youth football teams in seven different age groups. Aside from football, SV Bevern also practises aerobics, dancing and gymnastics.

Current Team

Recent seasons

Honors 
 Landesliga Weser-Ems Champions: 2019
 Bezirksliga Weser-Ems 4 Champions: 2016
 Kreisliga Cloppenburg Champions: 2013
 Kreispokal Cloppenburg Winners: 2013

Records 
 Highest Win
 7–1 SV Molbergen, 3 July 2021
 6–0 SV DJK Elsten, 9 July 2021
 Highest Loss
 1–4 VfL Oldenburg, 16 August 2020
 0–3 Blau-Weiß Lohne, 6 October 2019
 0–3 SV Hansa Friesoythe, 21 August 2021

References

External links 

 
 
 
 SV Bevern at kicker.de

 
Football clubs in Germany
Football clubs in Lower Saxony
Association football clubs established in 1975
1975 establishments in Germany
Cloppenburg (district)